The Australian Christian College system is a group of nine non-denominational Christian schools in Australia. The ACC schools are located in:
 Moreton, Queensland
 Singleton, New South Wales
 Marsden Park, New South Wales
 Hume, Victoria
 Darling Downs, Western Australia
 Southlands, Western Australia
 Burnie, Tasmania
 Hobart, Tasmania 
 Launceston, Tasmania
Australian Christian is a great school where children strive to achieve. 

The Australian Christian Colleges are operated by Christian Education Ministries.

References

External links